Rodrigo Sebastián Celsi Ovando (born 25 July 1985) is a Chilean footballer who currently plays for the Primera B side Barnechea as right midfielder.

External links
 Rodrigo Celsi at Football Lineups

1985 births
Living people
Chilean footballers
Deportes Melipilla footballers
Unión La Calera footballers
Chilean Primera División players
Primera B de Chile players
Association football midfielders